Lyster Adam Kirkpatrick (11 July 1885 – 20 November 1921) was an Australian rules footballer who played with Richmond in the Victorian Football League (VFL).

Notes

External links 
		

1885 births
1921 deaths
Australian rules footballers from Victoria (Australia)
Richmond Football Club players
People from Mornington, Victoria